The murder of Teresa Sievers occurred on June 28, 2015, when she was attacked at her home in Bonita Springs, Florida by two men who bludgeoned her to death with a hammer, striking her a total of seventeen times. Police arrested two men from Missouri for the crime: Curtis Wayne Wright Jr. and Jimmy Ray Rodgers. In December 2015, Teresa's husband, Mark Sievers, was arrested and accused of orchestrating the killing, with the motive being life insurance money, as well as the fact that Teresa was supposedly going to take his daughters away from him and he could not afford to fight for custody. All three men were found guilty of the murder. Wright was sentenced to twenty-five years, Rodgers was sentenced to life in prison, and Mark Sievers was sentenced to death.

Background
Teresa Sievers (born Teresa Ann Grace Tottenham) was born on November 19, 1968, at Griffin Hospital in Derby, Connecticut. Her parents separated when she was one month old, and she was raised by her mother. Since sixth grade, she had an interest in medicine and wanted to become a doctor. She was the valedictorian of her high school class. In 1996, she graduated from the Ross University School of Medicine in Dominica. She later completed a pre-med course at Fairfield University and completed her residency at the University of Florida.

In 2000, she married a man named Kenny Cousins. Three years later the couple divorced, and Teresa met another man called Mark Sievers through his sister, with whom she was good friends. In 2003, Teresa married Mark and the couple had two daughters. In 2006, they moved to Bonita Springs, Florida and set up a holistic medical practice called Restorative Health and Healing Center. Shortly before her death, Teresa was profiled in a local women's magazine.

Murder
In 2015, Mark went to the wedding of his childhood friend Curtis Wayne Wright Jr. in Missouri and confided in him that he was having marriage problems with Teresa. Mark feared she was going to take his two daughters away from him and said he could not afford to fight for custody. Wright told Mark that his only option was for her to die. Mark said he would pay Wright to help him, so the two men then planned how to murder Teresa. Mark also wanted Teresa killed so he could claim life insurance money. Investigators would later discover there were five insurance policies on Teresa totaling $4.433 million. Unbeknownst to Mark, Wright later enlisted the help of a third man to assist in the killing, Jimmy Ray Rodgers, who Wright paid to help him.

On the morning of June 27, 2015, Wright took a rental car from Hillsboro, Missouri and went to pick up Rodgers. The two men then drove over 1,000 miles to the home of Teresa Sievers in Bonita Springs, Florida. A GPS system log, which was later shown as evidence in court, tracked the route the men took. En route, they stopped at a gas station and were caught on surveillance tape. The men arrived at Teresa's home at approximately 6:00 a.m. on the morning of Sunday, June 28, 2015. They entered the property and disabled the security alarm before leaving and taking another drive. The men were caught on surveillance tape at a local Walmart store where they purchased trash bags, wet wipes, black towels, black shoes, and a lock-picking kit. They then returned to Teresa's home and waited for several hours until she returned.

Teresa landed at Southwest Florida International Airport that night, having cut short a family vacation in Connecticut. Mark had driven her to LaGuardia Airport in New York City earlier in the day so she could catch a flight home. She had flown home alone so she could see patients at her clinic the following morning. She was last seen alive on surveillance video at the airport in Florida. Teresa returned to her home where she was ambushed by Wright and Rodgers. The two men attacked her in the kitchen and struck her repeatedly with a hammer. Teresa was hit a total of seventeen times and was bludgeoned to death. Her killers then left and drove back to Missouri in the early hours of June 29.

Aftermath

On June 29, 2015, Teresa was found dead at her home by a family friend. Mark had called the friend to check up on her after she failed to show up at work. She was discovered lying on the kitchen floor and investigators found a hammer next to her body. A week later, her funeral took place at Unity Church in Naples. Mark attended the funeral and walked down the church aisle with his two daughters, appearing distraught. At the funeral, he gave a speech and said, "I was, and still am, the luckiest man in the world."

No leads came in the case for nearly two months. In August 2015, police acted on a tip and arrested Rodgers and Wright in Missouri. Both men were charged with murder. Rodger's girlfriend helped police with their investigation and told them that Rodgers had admitted to killing Teresa Sievers. She claimed that Rodgers had told her that Mark Sievers had hired Wright, who then hired Rodgers to murder his wife for life insurance money.

In December 2015, Mark Sievers was charged with murder after a connection was found between him and Wright. Suspicion had been on Mark from early on. Hours after Teresa's funeral, investigators had watched him throw computer equipment into a dumpster behind the couple's medical office. While Mark had initially been cooperative and handed over his cell phone to investigators, he later refused to cooperate.

On May 11, 2016, Teresa's mother gained custody of Teresa's children as the case prepared to move toward trial.

Trials
Wright took a 25-year plea deal in exchange for his testimony against Mark and Rodgers. In 2016, Wright pleaded guilty to second-degree murder and was sentenced to twenty-five years in prison. Rodgers initially faced a first-degree murder charge and the possibility of the death penalty. However, he was found guilty of the lesser charge of second-degree murder, in addition to trespassing. On October 23, 2019, a Lee County jury found him guilty and on December 12, he was sentenced to life in prison.

Mark Sievers was found guilty of first-degree murder. On December 4, 2019, he was convicted of first-degree murder and the jury unanimously recommended he receive the death penalty. On January 3, 2020, Judge Bruce Kyle sentenced him to death. He remains on death row at Union Correctional Institution. On November 17, 2022, his conviction was affirmed by the Florida Supreme Court and his death row appeal was denied. On December 1, 2022, Sievers filed a new motion for a rehearing in hopes of reversing the ruling.

In popular culture
In February 2017, the CBS News documentary show, 48 Hours, aired an episode that focused on the murder of Teresa Sievers. Three years later in February 2020, they aired another episode that focused on the murder trials that followed her killing.

On September 14, 2017, Crime Watch Daily released a video segment focusing on the murder. They continued to track the story until May 2019, with the original video segment being released on their YouTube channel on May 6, 2019.

On December 10, 2019, WFTX-TV (FOX 4 Now) released footage from the trial of Mark Sievers' when the jury recommended he be sentenced to death. The video went viral on their YouTube channel and has since received over thirteen million views.

See also
 List of death row inmates in the United States

References

2015 in Florida
2015 murders in the United States
Bonita Springs, Florida
Capital murder cases
Capital punishment in Florida
Deaths by person in Florida
Female murder victims
June 2015 crimes in the United States
June 2015 events in the United States
Murder in Florida
Violence against women in the United States
Hammer assaults